Carbon monosulfide is a chemical compound with the formula CS. This diatomic molecule is the sulfur analogue of carbon monoxide, and is unstable as a solid or a liquid, but it has been observed as a gas both in the laboratory and in the interstellar medium. The molecule resembles carbon monoxide with a triple bond between carbon and sulfur. The molecule is not intrinsically unstable, but it tends to polymerize. This tendency reflects the greater stability of C–S single bonds.

Polymers with the formula (CS)n have been reported. Also, CS has been observed as a ligand in some transition metal complexes.

References

Inorganic carbon compounds
Sulfides